Georges Frédéric Ziesel (1757–1809), was a Flemish flower and still life painter.

Biography
He was born in Hoogstraten on 15 April 1757 and became a follower of Jan van Huysum.

He died in Antwerp on 26 June 1809.

References

External links

Georges Frédéric Ziesel on Artnet

1757 births
1809 deaths
18th-century Flemish painters
19th-century Flemish painters
Artists from Antwerp
Flemish still life painters
Flower artists